Amphimallon fuscum is a species of beetle in the Melolonthinae subfamily that can be found in Italy, Kosovo, Montenegro, Serbia, Switzerland, Voivodina, and on the island of Sicily.

References

Beetles described in 1796
fuscum
Beetles of Europe